Sybil Ann Sheridan (born 27 September 1953) is a writer and British Reform rabbi. She was chair of the Assembly of Reform Rabbis UK at the Movement for Reform Judaism from 2013 to 2015 and was Rabbi at Wimbledon and District Synagogue in south west London. As of 2020 she is part-time rabbi at Newcastle Reform Synagogue.

Sybil Sheridan has edited two books and contributed to several academic publications. She is a major contributor to interfaith dialogue, both nationally and internationally, and has a particular interest in Jewish-Muslim dialogue and especially between women. She co-chaired the Home Office International Conference for Women in Judaism and Islam.

She has strong links to Israel and to the educational festival Limmud. She has lectured at Leo Baeck College and the Muslim College, London. She is on the International Editorial Advisory Board of Nashim: A Journal of Jewish Women's Studies & Gender Issues published by Indiana University Press. For eight years she was Jewish chaplain at the University of Roehampton.

Early years
A child of German-Jewish refugees, she grew up in Bolton, Lancashire, a member of Manchester Reform Synagogue. She read theology and religious studies at Cambridge University, being one of the first two Jews to do so (the other being Walter Rothschild). She then studied at Leo Baeck College and at the Pardes Institute in Jerusalem, and was ordained as a rabbi in 1981, one of the first women in Europe in the role.

Career
After four years at Ealing Liberal Synagogue, she took extended maternity leave, during which time she wrote a book of children's stories, lectured at Leo Baeck College, and worked with the Swindon Jewish Community. In 1994 Rabbi Sheridan became Rabbi of the Thames Valley Jewish Community (now known as the Reading Liberal Jewish Community) and remained there until her appointment as Rabbi of Wimbledon and District Synagogue. She job shared with Rabbi Sylvia Rothschild in that post from 2003 until early 2014. In 2014 she became Rabbi at West London Synagogue.

In 2011 she produced, with Cantor Zoe Jacobs of Finchley Reform Synagogue, what is thought to be the first major new collection of synagogue music published in the UK for nearly a century. Shirei Ha-t'fillah (Songs of Prayer), a compilation of sheet music and explanatory articles, was published by the Movement for Reform Judaism.

As of 2020 she is part-time rabbi at Newcastle Reform Synagogue.

Social justice
Sybil Sheridan has made several visits to Ethiopia to find out about and support the Jews in Gondar. She was inspired by her visit to set up a new charity, Meketa (Amharic for protection or support), after seeing at first hand the poverty and lack of resources available.

In February 2013 she was one of a group of Christian, Jewish, Muslim and Sikh leaders who met at Parliament to urge MPs to support a radical overhaul of the financial system including debt cancellation for the most indebted countries, more progressive taxation and an end to harmful lending.

Personal life
She is married to Jonathan Romain, Rabbi of Maidenhead Synagogue, and they have four adult sons.

Publications

Books
 Sybil Sheridan: "Abraham from a Jewish Perspective" in Norman Solomon, Richard Harries, Timothy Winter (eds): Abraham's Children: Jews, Christians and Muslims in Conversation, pp. 9–17, London and New York: T & T Clark, 2005.   (hardback);  (paperback)
 Stephen Bigger: Creating the Old Testament: The Emergence of the Hebrew Bible, Basil Blackwell, 1989.  . Sheridan contributed two chapters
 Sybil Sheridan (ed.): Hear our voice: women in the British rabbinate, Studies in Comparative Religion series. Paperback, 1st North American edition. Columbia, South Carolina: University of South Carolina Press, 1998. 
 Sybil Sheridan (ed.): Hear our voice: women rabbis tell their stories. Paperback, 203 pages. London: SCM Press, 1994. 
 Sylvia Rothschild and Sybil Sheridan (eds.): Taking Up the Timbrel: The Challenge of Creating Ritual for Jewish Women Today. London: SCM Press, 2000
 Sybil Sheridan: "Human Nature and Destiny" in Seth Daniel Kunin (ed): Themes and Issues in Judaism, World Religions: Themes and Issues, pp. 166–191. New York: Cassell, 2000.  (hardback);  (paperback)

For young people
Sybil Sheridan, illustrated by Olivia Rayner: Jewish World, Stories from the Religious World series. Paperback, 48 pages. Silver Burdett, 1987. . The stories include recent historical experience in the Holocaust

Journal articles and lectures
 Sybil Sheridan: "Are We Prisoners of Our History?" in European Judaism, volume 28, no. 2, Autumn 1995, pp. 68–72. Berghahn Books Inc. 
 Sybil Sheridan: "History of Women in the Rabbinate: A Communal Case of Amnesia". Lecture delivered at BET DEBORA – European Conference of Women Rabbis, Cantors, Scholars and all Spiritually Interested Jewish Women and Men, Berlin, May 1999
 Sybil Sheridan: "My first day at Leo Baeck College" in European Judaism, 39, no.1, Spring 2006, pp. 69–70. Berghahn Books Inc. 
 Sybil Sheridan: "Aliza Lavie Tefillat Nashim: Jewish Women's Prayers Throughout The Ages (Book review)", Nashim: A Journal of Jewish Women's Studies and Gender Issues, no.15, Spring 2008, p. 212. Indiana University Press.

Newspaper articles
 Sybil Sheridan: "What future for the Jews left in Ethiopia?", The Jewish Chronicle, 10 June 2009
 Sybil Sheridan: "We must not abandon the Jews left in Ethiopia", The Jewish Chronicle, 26 January 2014

Podcasts
Stefanie Sinclair: Regina Jonas: the first female rabbi, Open University, 2013. Includes an interview with Sybil Sheridan

References

External links
Official blog
Movement for Reform Judaism page on Rabbi Sybil Sheridan
Einat Ramon: "Taking Up the Timbrel: The Challenge of Creating Ritual for Jewish Women Today (review)", Nashim: A Journal of Jewish Women's Studies & Gender Issues, no. 7, Spring 2004, pp. 236–239
Shmuel Rosner (9 January 2015) "Rosner’s Torah-Talk: Parashat Shemot with Rabbi Sybil Sheridan", Jewish Journal. Retrieved 13 August 2017.

1953 births
Living people
20th-century English rabbis
21st-century English rabbis
Alumni of Girton College, Cambridge
Alumni of Leo Baeck College
British Reform rabbis
English Jewish writers
English people of German-Jewish descent
Clergy from Bolton
Reform women rabbis
West London Synagogue